The Lonely Voice (1962) is a study of the short story form, written by Frank O'Connor.

Description
Within the study, O'Connor expounds on some of his own major theories of the short story as well as discusses the work of many influential short story writers. Each chapter focuses on a different author:

Ivan Turgenev
Guy de Maupassant
Anton Chekhov
Rudyard Kipling 
James Joyce
Katherine Mansfield
D. H. Lawrence  
Ernest Hemingway
A. E. Coppard
Isaac Babel
Mary Lavin

Reception
One of the work's major contributions is that of "the submerged population group" - a term that O'Connor uses to characterise those individuals who, for whatever reasons, are left on the fringes of society. The term was taken up again in the twenty-first century by Amit Chaudhuri to usefully characterise modernist writing in the Indian subcontinent.

The book is seen by many critics as the first lengthy examination of the short story form, and it has been heralded by many writers as an influential work.

References

Works by Frank O'Connor
1962 non-fiction books
Books of literary criticism
Short stories